The 1981 World Fencing Championships were held in Clermont-Ferrand, France. The event was held between July 2-13, 1981.

Medal table

Medal summary

Men's events

Women's events

References

World Fencing Championships
1981 in French sport
Sport in Clermont-Ferrand
International fencing competitions hosted by France
1981 in fencing
July 1981 sports events in Europe